KRI dr. Soeharso is a hospital ship of the Indonesian Navy. She was initially designed and built in 2003 in South Korea as a landing platform dock named KRI Tanjung Dalpele. However, after her launch she was redesignated as a multi-purpose hospital ship. In 2020, dr. Soeharso was used to transport Indonesian crew from cruise ships during the COVID-19 pandemic.

Design and description
As built, Tanjung Dalpele was constructed as a landing platform dock (LPD). The vessel is powered by a combined diesel and diesel (CODAD) system comprising two Burmeister & Wain (B&W) 8L28/32A diesel engines turning two shafts creating .

The vessel is equipped with a well deck and is capable of accommodating two LCU-23M landing craft and two landing craft for vehicles and personnel (LCVPs). As an LPD, Tanjung Dalpele had a lift capacity of 13 tanks and 507 troops. The vessel is equipped with hospital facilities (five operating rooms and six polyclinics) and is utilised as a hospital ship by the Indonesian Navy. As a hospital ship the vessel is capable of accepting up to 2,000 patients and has a crew of 126 with 51 medical specialists.

As built, the ship was armed with one  gun and twin-mounted  guns. The ship has a hangar and helicopter deck at the stern and is capable of operating two Super Puma helicopters.

Construction and career
The contract for the US$35 million ship was signed with Daewoo International in September 2003. The vessel was built by Daesun Shipbuilding at their shipyard in Pusan, South Korea, with the keel being laid in 2002. Named Tanjung Dalpele, the ship was launched on 17 May 2003 and entered service with the Indonesian Navy in September of that year. In February 2007, Tanjung Dalpele carried the families of the victims of Adam Air Flight KI-574 to the site of the crash for a memorial service.

On 1 August 2007 the ship was changed to a hospital ship, and was renamed KRI dr. Soeharso with the pennant number 990. In 2016, dr. Soeharso performed its first overseas mission, deploying to Timor-Leste on a medical care mission.

2020 coronavirus pandemic

dr. Soeharso picked up 188 Indonesian crew of the cruise ship World Dream in the Durian Strait on 26 February 2020. The vessel took them to Sebaru Kecil Islet and placed under quarantine.

dr. Soeharso evacuated 89 crew of the cruise ship Diamond Princess from Indramayu thermal power plant port, after the crew got health certificate from Japan and flew to Kertajati International Airport. They then used buses to travel to port. The crew underwent a second round of test, in which one of the crew tested positive for COVID-19 and was hospitalized in Jakarta. 68 crew of Diamond Princess disembarked at Sebaru Kecil Islet. World Dream evacuees and Diamond Princess evacuees used separated blocks/buildings.

Notes

Citations

References
 
 
 

Auxiliary ships of the Indonesian Navy
Hospital ships of Indonesia
Ships built by Daewoo Shipbuilding & Marine Engineering
2003 ships
Hospital ships involved in the COVID-19 pandemic